Geoffrey C. Gatza (born 1970) is an American poet and editor and the publisher of BlazeVOX [books], an independent press based in Buffalo, New York.

Early life and education
Gatza grew up in Kenmore in Erie County, New York and attended four schools in the Kenmore-Town of Tonawanda School District: Jane Addams Elementary School, Lindbergh Elementary School, Kenmore Middle School, and Kenmore West High School.

He is a graduate of the Culinary Institute of America in Hyde Park, New York and Daemen College in Amherst, New York.

Personal life
Gatza resides in Kenmore, New York with his girlfriend Donna.

Books
 House of Forgetting (2012)
 Secrets of My Prison House (2010)
 La Santa Muerte, the Saint of Death (2010)
 Housecat Kung Fu: Strange Poems For Wild Children (2009)
 Not So Fast Robespierre (2008)
 E: Electron (with Deena Larsen) (2001)

The last of these books uses the periodic table of elements as the structure for a love story. As the story progresses, another "electron" of memory is added to the lives of the book's primary "elements."

References

External links
 Official website

1970 births
American publishers (people)
Poets from New York (state)
Living people
People from Kenmore, New York
Culinary Institute of America Hyde Park alumni
American male poets
Daemen College alumni
21st-century American poets
21st-century American male writers